Bicornis is an extinct genus of diatoms with one known species.

References

†
Monotypic SAR supergroup genera